The oxidation of secondary alcohols to ketones is an important oxidation reaction in organic chemistry.

When a secondary alcohol is oxidised, it is converted to a ketone. The hydrogen from the hydroxyl group is lost along with the hydrogen bonded to the carbon attached to oxygen. The remaining oxygen then forms double bonds with the carbon. This leaves a ketone, as R1–COR2. Ketones are quite resistant to further oxidation as it would require breaking an adjacent C–C bond, but with strong oxidants this may occur and produces esters or carboxylic acids.

The reaction can occur using a variety of oxidants.

Potassium dichromate

A secondary alcohol can be oxidised into a ketone using acidified potassium dichromate and heating under reflux.
The orange-red dichromate ion, Cr2O72−, is reduced to the green Cr3+ ion. This reaction was once used in an alcohol breath test.

PCC (Pyridinium chlorochromate)
Pyridinium chlorochromate (PCC), when used in an organic solvent, can be used to oxidise a secondary alcohol into a ketone. It has the advantage of doing so selectively without the tendency to over-oxidise.

Dess–Martin oxidation 
The Dess–Martin periodinane is a mild oxidant for the conversion of alcohols to aldehydes or ketones.

The reaction is performed under standard conditions, at room temperature, most often in dichloromethane. The reaction takes between half an hour and two hours to complete. The product is then separated from the spent periodinane.

Swern oxidation 
Swern oxidation oxidises secondary alcohols into ketones using oxalyl chloride and dimethylsulfoxide. It also requires an organic base, such as triethylamine.

The by-products are dimethyl sulfide (Me2S), carbon monoxide (CO), carbon dioxide (CO2) and – when triethylamine is used as base – triethylammonium chloride (C6H15NHCl). Dimethyl sulfide and carbon monoxide are very toxic and malodorous compounds, so the reaction and the work-up needs to be performed in a fume hood or outdoors.

Oppenauer oxidation

Fétizon oxidation

Silver carbonate on celite oxidizes alcohols through single electron oxidation by the silver cations.

See also
 Oxidation of primary alcohols to carboxylic acids
 Secondary alcohol

References

Organic oxidation reactions